Manderdisa is village located in Dima Hasao district of Assam state of India. The village is in two parts and the combined population in the 2011 Census of India was 508 people. Manderdisa railway station of the Indian Railways serves this village and neighboring areas.

See also 
 Dima Hasao district
 Manderdisa railway station

References 

Dima Hasao district
Villages in Dima Hasao district